Monterey is a home rule-class city in Owen County, Kentucky, United States. At the 2000 U.S. census, the population was 167.

Geography
The downtown area is listed on the National Register of Historic Places as the Monterey Historic District.

Demographics

As of the census of 2000, there were 167 people, 55 households, and 42 families residing in the city. The racial makeup of the city was 97.60% White, 0.60% Native American, 0.60% Asian, and 1.20% from two or more races.

There were 55 households, out of which 54.5% had children under the age of 18 living with them, 60.0% were married couples living together, 9.1% had a female householder with no husband present, and 23.6% were non-families. 20.0% of all households were made up of individuals, and 9.1% had someone living alone who was 65 years of age or older. The average household size was 3.04 and the average family size was 3.52.

In the city, the population was spread out, with 35.3% under the age of 18, 10.8% from 18 to 24, 28.7% from 25 to 44, 19.2% from 45 to 64, and 6.0% who were 65 years of age or older. The median age was 29 years. For every 100 females, there were 103.7 males. For every 100 females age 18 and over, there were 103.8 males.

The median income for a household in the city was $26,094, and the median income for a family was $26,406. Males had a median income of $24,821 versus $25,000 for females. The per capita income for the city was $8,452. About 34.9% of families and 33.5% of the population were below the poverty line, including 33.8% of those under the age of eighteen and 40.0% of those 65 or over.

References

Cities in Kentucky
Cities in Owen County, Kentucky